Aleksandar Vučić – Together We Can Do Everything (AV–ZMS), commonly shortened to just Together We Can Do Everything, is a parliamentary group in the National Assembly led by the Serbian Progressive Party (SNS).

SNS gained its parliamentary status following the formation of "Forward, Serbia" parliamentary group in September 2008, and a month later it was renamed to "Serbian Progressive Party", following the registration of the party. It had cooperated with the Democratic Party of Serbia (DSS) and New Serbia (NS) from its formation until 2010, when SNS formed a coalition with NS, and two other parties, the Movement of Socialists (PS) and Strength of Serbia Movement (PSS). The coalition was formalised for the 2012 parliamentary election under the "Let's Get Serbia Moving" banner, in which it won 73 seats, and formed a government with the Socialist Party of Serbia (SPS) and United Regions of Serbia (URS).

Tomislav Nikolić, then president of Serbia, called snap parliamentary elections to be held in March 2014. SNS formed the "Future We Believe In" list, in which the Serbian Renewal Movement (SPO) and Christian Democratic Party of Serbia (DHSS) also participated, and the list managed to win 158 seats in total. After the election, Aleksandar Vučić, president of SNS, was appointed prime minister, succeeding Ivica Dačić. Vučić called snap elections in early 2016, and after which, the Party of United Pensioners of Serbia (PUPS) and Serbian People's Party (SNP) joined. It participated under the "Serbia is Winning" banner, which won 131 seats in the National Assembly. The latest formation, the "For Our Children" coalition, participated in the 2020 parliamentary election, in which it won a supermajority of seats, and the convocation lasted until February 2022.

The SNS-led coalition participated in the 2022 general election under the "Together We Can Do Everything" banner. The coalition has also ruled Belgrade since 2014, and Vojvodina since 2016, while the presidency is currently occupied by Vučić.

History

Foundation and early history 

The Serbian Progressive Party (SNS) gained its parliamentary group status as a faction inside the far-right Serbian Radical Party (SRS) in September 2008, and a month later, SNS was officially formalised as a party, initially holding 21 MPs. During the foundation of SNS, the party had expressed its support towards the creation of a conservative political coalition, in which the Democratic Party of Serbia (DSS) and New Serbia (NS) would take part. This idea was later realised by SNS, although on local level, after the 2009 local elections in Zemun, and later that year in Voždovac. A year later, Tomislav Nikolić stated that their cooperation would be extended. DSS rejected the formation of a coalition for the upcoming elections, which led to the signing of the cooperation agreement in November 2010 between SNS, NS, and two other parties, the Movement of Socialists (PS) and Strength of Serbia Movement (PSS). Its first meeting was held in February 2011, after which they began organising mass protests across Belgrade. During the protests, Nikolić demanded for the elections to be called earlier. The protests continued until April 2011.

The coalition was formalised in March 2012, under the name "Let's Get Serbia Moving", which also included Bosniak People's Party (BNS), Democratic Party of Macedonians (DPM), People's Peasant Party (NSS), Roma Party (RP), and minor organisations. It was also the name for one of their slogans during the 2012 elections, and the name of their ballot list for the 2012 parliamentary election. The coalition stated some of their main goals to be the improvement of the economy, and fighting against crime and corruption, while its representative, Nikolić, was described as a nationalist. Despite predictions of a victory for Boris Tadić, Nikolić ended up winning the presidential election, while in the parliamentary election, the "Let's Get Serbia Moving" ballot list won 73 seats in the National Assembly. It did not manage to place first in the Vojvodina election, where it only won 22 seats. Shortly after the election, Nikolić stepped down as president of SNS, and Aleksandar Vučić was appointed president. Nikolić offered a mandate to Ivica Dačić, the leader of the Socialist Party of Serbia (SPS) who has previously been a part of the Democratic Party-led (DS) government, to form a government with SNS and the United Regions of Serbia (URS). Dačić shortly after began the formation, which was finalised in July 2012. Veroljub Arsić was appointed head of SNS parliamentary group, while Zoran Babić served as deputy head until August 2013, when they switched places.

The coalition was extended in late 2013, when the Serbian Renewal Movement (SPO) signed a cooperation agreement with SNS, after previously cutting ties with DS couple months earlier. During the 2012–2014 convocation, SPO was a part of a parliamentary group with the Christian Democratic Party of Serbia (DHSS).

2014 elections 
The SNS–SPS government, led by Dačić, was re-shuffled in July 2013 due to disagreements between the governing parties. Dačić also threatened SNS that, his party would leave the government if SNS does not accept the re-shuffle, which also speculated that snap elections might be called earlier. While Dačić's government lasted, Vučić's popularity significantly grew up, and in January 2014, Vučić suggested to call snap parliamentary elections, which was accepted by Dačić's party, and president Nikolić then called the election to be held in March 2014. This time, the SNS-led coalition participated under the "Future We Believe In" banner, with Vučić as its candidate for prime minister. The ballot list also included SPO, DHSS, and Social Democratic Party of Serbia (SDPS), who did not appear on the SNS ballot list in 2012.

The coalition won 158 seats in the total, surpassing the number of seats needed for a majority. City Assembly elections were also held in Belgrade, where it also won a majority of seats. Shortly after the election, SNS and SPS had decided to continue their cooperation, and Vučić was appointed as prime minister in April 2014. While in Belgrade, Siniša Mali, an independent nominated by SNS, was chosen as mayor. The Serbian Progressive Party parliamentary group between 2014 and 2016 was composed of SNS, PSS, and NSS representatives.

2016 elections 
In January 2016, Vučić suggested to call snap elections, claiming that "Serbia needs more stability in order to join the European Union". Shortly after, the Party of United Pensioners of Serbia (PUPS), who was a member of the SPS-led coalition, joined the SNS-led coalition, including the Serbian People's Party (SNP) and Independent Democratic Party of Serbia (SDSS). This time, the SNS-led coalition ran under the "Serbia is Winning" banner, and Vučić was again chosen as its ballot representative. DHSS and BNS did not appear on the ballot list, although the minor Serb Democratic Party (SDS) participated with the SNS-led coalition in Vojvodina. 

On national level, the "Serbia is Winning" coalition won 131 seats, while in the Vojvodina election, it managed to place first, winning 63 seats in total. Vučić continued his mandate, and SNS extended its cooperation with SPS. The Serbian Progressive Party parliamentary group between 2016 and 2020 was composed of SNS, SPO, SNP, and PSS representatives. Aleksandar Martinović succeeded Babić as head of the parliamentary group following the election. In early 2017, Velimir Ilić, the leader of NS, announced that his party left the SNS-led coalition. Vučić was elected president in the April 2017 election, and he then appointed Ana Brnabić to replace him as prime minister.

2018–2020 elections 

The SNS-led coalition also participated in the 2018 Belgrade City Assembly election, this time under the "Because we love Belgrade" banner. SNS nominated Zoran Radojičić as their mayoral candidate. The "Because we love Belgrade" ballot list won 64 seats, and in June 2018, Radojičić was sworn in as mayor, while Goran Vesić was sworn in as deputy mayor.

For the 2020 parliamentary election, the SNS-led coalition participated under the "For Our Children" banner, with Branislav Nedimović appearing first on the ballot. The United Peasant Party (USS), led by Milija Miletić, participated on the "For Our Children" ballot list. The "For Our Children" list managed to win a supermajority of seats, 188 in total, while in the Vojvodina election, it won 76 seats. Following the election, the parliamentary group changed its name from "Serbian Progressive Party" to "For Our Children", and between 2020 and 2022 it was composed of SNS, SPO, SNP, PSS, PS, and NSS representatives. In May 2021, the Serbian Patriotic Alliance (SPAS) merged into SNS, and its 10 MPs joined the "For Our Children" parliamentary group in early June.

2022 elections 
In February 2022, Brnabić formally announced that Vučić will be the ballot head representative for the presidential election, while Danica Grujičić will appear first on the ballot. Its mayoral candidate for the Belgrade City Assembly will be Aleksandar Šapić, who presided over SPAS during its existence. It was also announced that the SNS-led coalition would participate under the "Together We Can Do Everything" banner. Shortly after, Better Serbia (BS) joined the SNS-led coalition. They submitted their ballot list on 16 February, and it was confirmed by RIK a day later. Vučić won 58% of the popular vote in the first round of the presidential election, while the Together We Can Do Everything coalition lost 68 seats in comparison with the 2020 parliamentary election.

List of presidents of the parliamentary group

Members 

The following table includes political parties that participated on the "Together We Can Do Everything" ballot list in the 2022 parliamentary election. SDPS and PUPS are not members of the parliamentary group, and instead, they operate their own ones.

Former members

Electoral performance

Parliamentary elections

Provincial elections

Belgrade City Assembly elections

Presidential elections

References 

2012 establishments in Serbia
Political parties established in 2012
Political party alliances in Serbia
Serbian Progressive Party
Parliamentary groups